The 1965 COFL season was the first season of the Continental Football League (COFL). The COFL entered its inaugural season with franchises in Philadelphia, Springfield, Massachusetts, Newark, New Jersey, Toronto, Wheeling, West Virginia, Richmond, Virginia, Charleston, West Virginia, Hartford, Connecticut, Providence, Rhode Island, and Fort Wayne, Indiana.

Franchise changes
In April 1965 the Springfield franchise was purchased by a group from Norfolk, Virginia. The sale was approved and finalized in May.

General news
Happy Chandler was appointed commissioner in March 1965, with a five-year contract worth $50,000 per year.

Rules different from NFL
Games tied after four quarters move to a sudden death period.
On kickoffs, if the ball goes beyond the end zone the kicking team is given a five-yard penalty and must kick again until the ball is handled.
Fair catches are not allowed.
If the receiving team on a kickoff attempts to run the ball out of the end zone and does not reach the 20-yard-line, the ball is automatically placed at the 20.

Regular season
W = Wins, L = Losses, T = Ties, PCT= Winning Percentage, PF= Points For, PA = Points Against

 = Division Champion

Playoffs
Home team in CAPITALS

League Championship (November 28, 1965)
 CHARLESTON 24, Toronto 7

Awards
 Most Valuable Player: Bob Brodhead (QB, Philadelphia Bulldogs) & Joe Williams (FB, Toronto Rifles)
 Coach of the Year: Perry Ross, Charleston

References

Continental Football League seasons
1965 in American football